Brian Robert McBride (born June 19, 1972) is an American former soccer player who played as a forward for Columbus Crew, Fulham and Chicago Fire. He is the fifth-highest all-time leading goalscorer for the United States national team.

For much of his career, he played in United States with stints in both Germany and England. During his time at Fulham, McBride became a fan favorite, as well as team captain. He was eventually voted "Player of the Season" two times. After leaving the club, they renamed the sports bar at Craven Cottage McBride's in his honor.

Early career

High school 
Born in Arlington Heights, Illinois, McBride played varsity soccer at Buffalo Grove High School, under coach John Erfort, where he led the Bison to the Illinois state championship in 1988, his junior year. During a playoff game against Fremd, McBride broke his nose in the first half, but came back into the game to score the game-winning goal. In his four years in high school, he scored 80 goals, 33 as a senior despite playing his senior season as a defender. In the regional final, during McBride's senior season, against Stevenson High School, he played goalkeeper. In the final, McBride stopped four of eight penalty kicks taken against him, and he scored the fifth, and winning, goal on a counterattack in extra time after the game ended tied at regulation. McBride was also named an All-American by Parade Magazine. Later, as a professional, he signed a contract with Nike with the condition that the boys' varsity soccer team receive new uniforms every two years.

College 
McBride had an illustrious career with Saint Louis University, from which he graduated in 1993. In his four seasons with the Billikens, he played (and started) in 89 games, and set career records for goals (72), assists (40) and total points (184). While at school, McBride was a 1992 second team and a 1993 first-team All-American. He also was named Most Valuable Player of the Great Midwest Conference three years straight, as well as being named to the All-Conference first-team during this stretch. He trained at the world-famous Magna Fitness Center. After being such a versatile player in his amateur career, McBride decided to become a striker at the professional level. Craig Burley warned McBride that he should expect to get clattered playing that position.

McBride is one of 22 college players to be part of the 40-40 club, having both 40 goals and 40 assists in their college career.

Club career

Milwaukee Rampage 
McBride briefly played for the minor league Milwaukee Rampage. In 18 games, he scored 17 goals and assisted another 18. That year also saw Tony Sanneh playing with the Rampage. Both Sanneh and McBride played professionally in Germany, in MLS and on the United States men's national team.

They linked up for a historic goal at the 2002 FIFA World Cup. In a game against Portugal, Sanneh, playing right back, played a cross into the box which McBride put into the top corner. After the game, McBride mentioned, "We joked about it in the locker room, it is a play we have done a thousand times [while teammates with the Milwaukee Rampage]. "I took a step in at the far post and lost my marker. He delivered a beautiful cross and I knocked it home."

VfL Wolfsburg
In 1994, McBride left the United States to ply his trade in Germany. At the time, VfL Wolfsburg played in the German Second Division and provided several aspiring American players an opportunity to play soccer in Europe. These included Chad Deering, Claudio Reyna and Mike Lapper, as well as McBride. McBride struggled to find playing time with the club and also had difficulty scoring. However, one of his two goals came in a 2–1 victory over Bayern Munich's reserve team in the DFB-Pokal quarterfinals – Wolfsburg went on to reach the final, although McBride did not feature. At the end of the season, McBride gained a release from Wolfsburg and when MLS was created, chose to return to play in the United States.

Columbus Crew
McBride returned to America in 1996 for the inaugural season of Major League Soccer, for whom he was the first overall pick of the MLS Inaugural Draft. McBride played eight years with the Columbus Crew, scoring 62 goals (no longer tied for the club record with Jeff Cunningham) and 45 assists in 161 league games, before his move to England. In 2005, he was named to the MLS All-Time Best XI.

In 2011, the Crew honored McBride by naming him the inaugural member of its Circle of Honor.

Loan spells
Whilst playing for Columbus, McBride had two loan spells in England. The first came in 2000 when McBride played for Preston North End, then managed by David Moyes. While McBride played well for the club, he sat out several games after having a blood clot surgically removed from his arm, which consisted of having a rib removed. The clot came as a result of a hard collision McBride had suffered during his first game with Preston. As McBride's loan spell came to an end, Preston attempted to purchase his contract from MLS for $1.8 million. MLS rejected it, considering McBride to be worth twice that amount.
Two years later, Premier League club Everton were beginning to slide down the table. David Moyes, by then with Everton, remembered McBride's success with Preston and sought the forward's services. During McBride's three months with the club, he did not disappoint Moyes, scoring four goals in eight games, including his first game with the club, a 4–3 defeat to Tottenham Hotspur. He made close friends during the short time with players such as Leon Osman (with whom he still plays soccer) and Richard Wright.
Everton, unlike Preston, merely sought to extend McBride's loan period, but MLS rejected it, preferring a transfer over an extended loan for McBride.

Fulham

In January 2004, Premier League club Fulham bought McBride's rights from MLS for $1.5 million. He played 18 games during the last half of the 2003–04 season, scoring a total of five goals. His scoring pace remained steady through the next two seasons. In 2004–05, he played 31 league games and six cup games, scoring six league and three cup goals. In 2005–06, he played 38 league games and one cup game, scoring ten league goals and one cup goal. McBride's original contract with Fulham continued only through the 2005–06 season. However, on March 10, 2006, he signed a one-year extension which took him through the end of the 2006–07 season. On February 2, 2007, he signed yet another one-year extension, taking him through the 2007–2008 season. He has a reputation as a battler with a high work rate, a trait prized in English soccer.

McBride was Fulham's top scorer for their 2006–07 Premier League campaign with twelve goals to his name. He was given Fulham's captaincy in August 2007.

When scoring the opening goal in a home match against Middlesbrough on August 18, 2007, McBride dislocated his kneecap. He did not make his return to action until a friendly against Cardiff City in late January 2008, and resumed his Premier League duties as a substitute against Aston Villa on February 3, 2008. McBride scored his first goal since his injury against Everton at Craven Cottage on March 16, 2008, in a 1–0 victory for Fulham. The then-Fulham manager Chris Coleman commented it was such a shame that McBride had not been 'discovered' earlier in his career, and played more in England.

After scoring twelve goals in 2006–07 season which helped Fulham retain their Premier League status, on May 14, 2007, McBride won the club's Player of the Year award. He won it again in 2008, and became such a popular figure that the club renamed a bar inside Craven Cottage "McBride's" in June 2009.

On May 28, 2008, McBride announced that he would be leaving Fulham to return to the United States to play in MLS.

Chicago Fire

Following the end of his one-year contract extension, McBride decided to return to the United States to end his career in MLS. He expressed his desire to play for Chicago, his hometown. However, Toronto FC held the top spot in the allocation order, the process by which U.S. National Team players returning to MLS find teams in the league.

On July 30, 2008, the top spot in the allocation order was traded to the Chicago Fire for Chad Barrett, a first round pick in the MLS SuperDraft and conditional future considerations. The Fire used the top spot to obtain McBride. He made his Fire debut on August 16, 2008, coming on as a second-half substitute against D.C. United.
McBride scored his first goal against Houston Dynamo. McBride scored the first goal in the MLS Playoff Eastern Conference Championship against the Columbus Crew, his former club. However, Chicago lost that game 2–1 and was kept from being in the MLS Playoff final.

McBride scored nine goals during the 2009 season, including two goals in the three SuperLiga games in which he played.

On September 3, 2010, McBride announced that he would retire following the 2010 MLS season. McBride scored his 80th career goal (in MLS) during his final match before being substituted off to a standing ovation.

Wembley
In June 2012, he was one of several former professional players who agreed to join Wembley to play in their FA Cup campaign for the new season. McBride and fellow former internationals Ray Parlour, Martin Keown, Claudio Caniggia, Jaime Moreno, Danny Dichio and Graeme Le Saux, plus David Seaman (goalkeeping coach) and former England manager Terry Venables (technical advisor), came out of retirement to play for Wembley. They were knocked out in a replay by Uxbridge after initially setting up the tie by knocking Langford out in the previous round.

International career
McBride was a significant player for the United States national team, earning 96 caps and scoring 30 goals in his senior international career. He made his national team debut in 1993, though he was not a member of the squad for the 1994 FIFA World Cup. He is the first-ever spokesperson for the Central Ohio Diabetes Association and donated $100 to the association for every goal and assist he tallied for the U.S. National Team.

He was part of the U.S. team that played at the 1998, 2002, and 2006 FIFA World Cups. He scored at the 1998 and 2002 tournaments and in doing so, became the first American player to score at two World Cups. (Fellow Landon Donovan and Clint Dempsey have since equaled this feat, the latter surpassing them with three.)  He was the only American player that scored in the 1998 tournament, which was in a 2–1 defeat to Iran. Overall McBride is fourth behind Bert Patenaude, Dempsey and Donovan for the most World Cup goals for an American with three.

On May 2, 2006, McBride was named to the U.S. roster for his third consecutive World Cup. At the 2006 World Cup, McBride was severely bloodied in a group stage match against Italy after being elbowed in the face by Daniele De Rossi. He needed three stitches. As punishment, De Rossi was banned for four matches and fined CHF 10,000. Following the end of the tournament, McBride announced his retirement from international duty on July 26, 2006.

In 2008 McBride briefly came out of international retirement after being named as one of the three overage players on the U.S. team for the 2008 Beijing Olympics and served as captain as the team finished in third place in the group stage for their group.

Coaching
McBride established the Brian McBride Soccer Academy which is based in Lake Zurich, Illinois.

In January 2020, McBride was named general manager of the United States men's national team.

Career statistics

Club

International
Scores and results list the United States' goal tally first, score column indicates score after each McBride goal.

Honors
Columbus Crew
 U.S. Open Cup: 2002

United States
 CONCACAF Gold Cup: 2002

Individual
 MLS Goal of the Year Award: 1998
 CONCACAF Gold Cup MVP: 2002
 CONCACAF Gold Cup Golden Shoe: 2002
 MLS Fair Play Award: 2003
 Fulham Player of the Year: 2005, 2006
 Chicago Fire Team Player of the Year: 2009
 Chicago Fire Golden Boot: 2009
 U.S. Soccer Hall of Fame: 2014

References

External links

 
 
 
 
 
 
 

1972 births
Living people
People from Arlington Heights, Illinois
Association football forwards
All-American men's college soccer players
American soccer players
American expatriate soccer players
American expatriate soccer players in Germany
Expatriate footballers in England
Chicago Fire FC players
Columbus Crew players
Everton F.C. players
Footballers at the 2008 Summer Olympics
Fulham F.C. players
Major League Soccer All-Stars
Major League Soccer players
Milwaukee Rampage players
Olympic soccer players of the United States
Premier League players
Preston North End F.C. players
Saint Louis University alumni
Saint Louis Billikens men's soccer players
English Football League players
USISL players
United States men's under-23 international soccer players
United States men's international soccer players
VfL Wolfsburg players
CONCACAF Gold Cup-winning players
1998 CONCACAF Gold Cup players
1998 FIFA World Cup players
1999 FIFA Confederations Cup players
2002 CONCACAF Gold Cup players
2002 FIFA World Cup players
2003 CONCACAF Gold Cup players
2006 FIFA World Cup players
2. Bundesliga players
American expatriate sportspeople in England
Soccer players from Illinois
Wembley F.C. players
Sportspeople from Cook County, Illinois
National Soccer Hall of Fame members